Chkalovskaya is a Moscow Metro station in the Basmanny District, Central Administrative Okrug, Moscow. It is on the Lyublinsko-Dmitrovskaya Line, between Sretensky Bulvar and Rimskaya stations.

Chkalovskaya opened on 28 December 1995 as the first stage of the Lyublinskiy radius.

Design
A team of architects designed the station: Nina Alexandrovna Aleshin, Leonid Borzenkov, and Aleksandr Vigdorov. Named after the famous Soviet aviator Valery Chkalov, the decorative theme is dedicated to aviation. The station is modified Pylon trivaulted at a depth of 51 metres. The pylons are revetted with grey and light blue wavy marble whilst the floor is covered with grey red and black granite. The hinged ceiling is covered in semi-circular lighting. The walls are done with combined marble tones.

Exits
An escalator leads from one end of the station's underground vestibule to Zemlyanoi Val street and Kurskiy Rail Terminal. The vestibule also acts as a transfer to Kurskaya-Koltsevaya. The other end of the hall is a direct transfer to Kurskaya-Radialnaya of the Arbatsko-Pokrovskaya Line, which opened on 28 March 1996.

External links

 News.metro.ru
  Metro Walks
  Nash Transport
 KartaMetro.info – Station location and exits on Moscow map (English/Russian)
 Mymetro.ru
 Mosmetro.ru (platform map)

Moscow Metro stations
Railway stations in Russia opened in 1995
Lyublinsko-Dmitrovskaya Line
Railway stations located underground in Russia